Lieutenant-General Sir Colin Bishop Callander KCB KBE MC (13 March 1897 – 31 May 1979) was a senior British Army officer who went on to be Military Secretary.

Military career
Born in Ilminster, Somerset in March 1897, Callander was educated at Ilminster Grammar School, and West Buckland School.

Shortly after the outbreak of the First World War in August 1914, Callander entered the Royal Military College at Sandhurst, and, after passing out from there, was commissioned into the Royal Munster Fusiliers in June 1915. He served with his regiment during the conflict, gaining the Military Cross (MC) in September 1916 but being wounded three times during the war. The citation for his MC reads:

After attending the Staff College, Camberley from 1933 to 1934, he was promoted to major in 1936 and went to the North West Frontier in India in 1938, for which he was mentioned in dispatches.

He served during the Second World War, where his rise was rapid, commanding first the 1/5th Battalion of the Leicestershire Regiment, followed by a brief period from April to May 1941 as the acting commander of the 148th Independent Infantry Brigade, his battalion's parent formation, which was then followed by his promotion to the acting rank of brigadier in July that year, upon assuming command of the 159th Infantry Brigade. Holding this position from August 1941 to May 1942, his next appointment was an 11-month stint as a Brigadier General Staff (BGS) of Western Command before becoming General Officer Commanding (GOC) of the 54th (East Anglian) Infantry Division, upon his promotion to the acting rank of major-general on 17 May 1943. This was followed by becoming GOC 76th Infantry Division in December 1943, before being assigned GOC 4th Division in Greece in December 1944. In 1945 he took the unconditional surrender at Knossos of German Forces serving in Crete under Generalmajor Hans-Georg Benthack.

He became GOC 2nd Division in the British Army of the Rhine (BAOR) in 1949 and Director General of Military Training at the War Office before that, in 1948. He was appointed Military Secretary in 1954 and retired in 1957. From 1954 to 1963 he was Colonel of the Royal Leicestershire Regiment from 1954 to 1963. He retired to Kent, where he spent his final years until his death in 1979, at the age of 82.

References

Bibliography

External links
Generals of World War II

 

|-
 

|-

|-

|-
 

|-

 

1897 births
1979 deaths
Graduates of the Staff College, Camberley
British Army generals of World War II
British Army personnel of World War I
Graduates of the Royal Military College, Sandhurst
Knights Commander of the Order of the Bath
Knights Commander of the Order of the British Empire
People educated at West Buckland School
People from Ilminster
Recipients of the Military Cross
Royal Leicestershire Regiment officers
Royal Munster Fusiliers officers
British Army lieutenant generals
Military personnel from Somerset